Josef Silný (23 January 1902 in Kroměříž – 18 May 1981) was a Czech football player.

Silný played for Hanácká Slavia Kroměříž, SK Slavia Praha (1923–1926), AC Sparta Prague (1926–1933), SC Nîmois (1933–1934) and Bohemians Praha (1934–1935).

He played for Czechoslovakia national team (50 matches and 28 goals), and was a participant at the 1934 FIFA World Cup, where he played in a match against Romania.

References

External links 
 
 Photograph of Josef Silný in the national team

1902 births
1981 deaths
Czech footballers
Czechoslovak footballers
Czechoslovakia international footballers
Czechoslovak expatriate footballers
Expatriate footballers in France
1934 FIFA World Cup players
Bohemians 1905 players
AC Sparta Prague players
SK Slavia Prague players
Ligue 1 players
Czech football managers
Czechoslovak football managers
People from Kroměříž
Czechoslovak expatriate sportspeople in France
Association football forwards
SK Hanácká Slavia Kroměříž players
Nîmes Olympique players
People from the Margraviate of Moravia
Sportspeople from the Zlín Region